The Charlotte County Courthouse is a historic county courthouse complex located at Charlotte Court House, Charlotte County, Virginia.  It was built in 1821–1823, and is a brick, temple-form structure, measuring approximately 45 feet wide and 71 feet deep. It was listed on the National Register of Historic Places in 1980  and is in the Charlotte Court House Historic District.  

It features a tetrastyle Tuscan order portico with whitewashed stuccoed columns.  It is based on plans supplied by Thomas Jefferson and is a prototype for numerous Roman Revival court buildings erected in Virginia in the 1830s and 1840s. Also on the property is a two-story, three-bay, brick office building used as a law office and a late Victorian Clerk's office, with a distinctive entrance tower and arched entrance.

Joseph R. Holmes, a delegate to the 1868 Virginia Constitutional Convention, was murdered outside the courthouse in 1869. He and fellow delegate Edward Nelson, who testified about the murder, were both Republicans and African American.

References

County courthouses in Virginia
Courthouses on the National Register of Historic Places in Virginia
National Register of Historic Places in Charlotte County, Virginia
Victorian architecture in Virginia
Government buildings completed in 1823
Buildings and structures in Charlotte County, Virginia
Individually listed contributing properties to historic districts on the National Register in Virginia
Thomas Jefferson buildings
1823 establishments in Virginia